The Xi'an Qujiang Sightseeing Monorail is a monorail line in Qujiang New District of Xi'an. The line is a broken loop on the edge of the Nanhu (南湖) public park.   

The system was completed in 2012, but did not receive approval for operations until 2015.  After three months of operation service was suspended due to piles from the piers interfering with construction of a metro line.  In 2018 a section of the route was demolished. The single track had previously formed a closed loop. 

Plans were revealed in late 2020 to re-open the monorail.  A report in July 2021 said the line will re-open in August after upgrade works are completed.

Technical Information
The three trains were built by Intamin, of the variety P8/48. Each train can carry 48 passengers. The line has a support column every 15 meters, except when crossing Beidajie (North Street), where a suspension bridge style is used instead.

References

Transport in Xi'an
People Porter people movers
Railway loop lines
Railway lines opened in 2021
Monorails
Monorails in China